The name Wicomico may refer to the following:

The Wicocomico or Wicomico people, an Algonquian-speaking Native American tribe, part of whom lived in the Tidewater region of Virginia
Wicomico River (disambiguation), several rivers tributary to the Chesapeake Bay watershed
Wicomico County, Maryland
, formerly USS Choctaw, a yard tug in the United States Navy
Wicomico High School